"Troublemaker" is the second of three promotional singles from Akon's third studio album, Freedom. The track features additional vocals from Sweet Rush. It was released as a digital download only single via iTunes on December 13, 2008. The track debuted at No. 97 on the U.S. Billboard Hot 100 and No. 65 on the Canadian Hot 100 on the chart week of November 29, 2008.

Track listing
 "Troublemaker" (Feat. Sweet Rush) - 3:57

Charts

References

2008 singles
Akon songs
Songs written by Akon
Song recordings produced by Akon
2008 songs
Universal Motown Records singles